Events from the year 1994 in Denmark.

Incumbents
 Monarch - Margrethe II
 Prime minister - Poul Nyrup Rasmussen

Events

Sports

Badminton
 Lillerød BK wins Europe Cup.

Cycling
 2July – 1994 Tour de France
 10July – Bo Hamburger wins the 8th stage
 16 July – Bjarne Riis wins the 13th stage
 19 August — Jesper Skibby wins the 1994 Ronde van Nederland.
2128 August Alex Pedersen wins gold in Men's amateur road race at the 1994 UCI Road World Championships.
 September – Rolf Sørensen wins the Paris–Brussels road cycling race.
 Kurt Betschart (SUI) and Bruno Risi (SUI) win the Six Days of Copenhagen sox-day track cycling race.

Football
 12 May  Brøndby IF wins the 1993–94 Danish Cup by defeating Næstved BK 31 after penalties in the final.

Other
 10–17April – With two gold medals, three silver medals and four bronze medals, Denmark finishes as the second best nation at the 14th European Badminton Championships in Den Bosch, Netherlands.
 September 1 — Erik Gundersen wins the 1984 Individual Speedway World Championship.
 25 September – Denmark wins gold at the 1994 European Women's Handball Championship in Germany by defeating host country 27–23 in the final.

Births
 31January – Kenneth Zohore, footballer
 10 February – Simone Christensen, BMX rider
 20 April – Line Kjærsfeldt, badminton player
 14 May – Pernille Blume, swimmer
 4 June – Viktor Fischer, footballer
 15 August – Lasse Vigen Christensen, footballer
 12 September – Amalie Thomsen, canoeist
 23 October – Nanna Koerstz Madsen, golfer
 30 November – Ida Villumsen, canoeist

Deaths

 25 September – Paul Høm, artist (born 1905)

See also
1994 in Danish television

References

 
Denmark
Years of the 20th century in Denmark
1990s in Denmark